Thaumatophyllum speciosum is a species of plant in the family Araceae, native to Brazil and Bolivia.

References

speciosum
Flora of South America
Plants described in 1837